The 1969 Madrid Grand Prix was a Formula One non-championship race held at Jarama, Madrid on 13 April 1969, run over 40 laps of the circuit. The field only included two Formula One cars, however, the remainder being Formula 5000 and Formula Two cars.

The entrants included Max Mosley, later to become president of the FIA, who drove a Formula Two Lotus.

The fastest combination in the event was clearly Peter Gethin in his F5000 McLaren-Chevrolet, but after an engine failure on the last lap, it was left to Keith Holland to take the victory, with the rest of the field at least a lap down. Contemporary reports listed Tony Dean (BRM P261) as finishing second having completed 39 out of 40 laps. However, Gethin broke down on lap 40 and some later reports classify him as second.

Qualifying
Note: a blue background indicates a Formula 5000 entrant and a pink background indicates a Formula Two entrant.

Classification

The fastest lap for a Formula One car during the race was 1:34.2 by Tony Dean.
‡Contemporary reports listed Dean as finishing second.

References
Footnotes

Sources

Madrid Grand Prix
Formula 5000 race reports